Technico is a Barbados football club, based in Black Bess, near Speightstown in the northern parish of Saint Peter.

They play in the Barbados' third division, the Barbados Second Division.

Achievements
none

Football clubs in Barbados